Öskü is a village in Veszprém county, Hungary.

Sightseeings
The rotunda stands in the centre of the village on the top of the hill. The apse is oriented to the east.  The rotunda of Öskü is a singularity in Hungary. Probably it was built in the 11th-12th century.

References
 Gervers-Molnár, V. (1972): A középkori Magyarország rotundái. (Rotunda in the Medieval Hungary). Akadémiai, Budapest
 Henszlmann, I. (1876): Magyarország ó-keresztyén, román és átmeneti stylü mű-emlékeinek rövid ismertetése, (Old-Christian, Romanesque and Transitional Style Architecture in Hungary). Királyi Magyar Egyetemi Nyomda, Budapest

External links 
 Street map (Hungarian)
 Öskü in the Vendégváró homepage
 Aerial Photography of Öskü and the rotunda

Populated places in Veszprém County
Romanesque architecture in Hungary